Petitcodiac Regional School is a combined primary and secondary public school located in Petitcodiac, New Brunswick, Canada.

It was originally built in 1951 and presently houses approximately 700 students from Kindergarten through grade 12 with a staff of approximately 48 teachers. The school contains three unique and separate areas housing the elementary school, the middle school and the high school with a common gymnasium, art room, music room, technology lab, wood shop, mechanics garage, and cafeteria.
 
Grades Kindergarten-5 is elementary, 6-8 is middle school, and 9-12 is high school.

See also
 Anglophone East School District

Reference List

External links
 Official School Website
 Anglophone East School District Website

Elementary schools in New Brunswick
Middle schools in New Brunswick
High schools in New Brunswick
Schools in Westmorland County, New Brunswick